Cheslor Jesly Cuthbert (born November 16, 1992) is a Nicaraguan professional baseball third baseman for the Leones de Yucatán of the Mexican League. He previously played in Major League Baseball (MLB) for the Kansas City Royals and Chicago White Sox.

Early life
Cuthbert was born and raised on Corn Islands, Nicaragua, where his mother is from. His father is from the town of Pearl Lagoon, Nicaragua. Growing up he spoke an English Creole rather than Spanish and had to balance learning Spanish while training with the Nicaraguan National Baseball team.

Professional career

Kansas City Royals
The Kansas City Royals signed Cuthbert as an international free agent in 2009, for a $1.35 million signing bonus. He made his professional debut in 2010. Prior to the 2012 season, Baseball America rated Cuthbert the 84th best prospect in baseball. After the 2012 season, he played for the Nicaraguan national baseball team in the 2013 World Baseball Classic Qualifying Tournament.

The Royals added Cuthbert to their 40-man roster on November 20, 2013. Cuthbert began the 2014 season with the Northwest Arkansas Naturals of the Class AA Texas League. When the Royals promoted third baseman Hunter Dozier to the Naturals, Cuthbert began playing first base and second base. He began the 2015 season with the Omaha Storm Chasers of the Class AAA Pacific Coast League, and represented the Royals at the 2015 All-Star Futures Game.

The Royals promoted Cuthbert to the major leagues on July 7, 2015, when Mike Moustakas was placed on family leave. Cuthbert got his first major league hit, a ground-ball single into left field the same day. Cuthbert was recalled from AAA Omaha on September 1, 2015. On September 2, Cuthbert hit his first major league home run, a two-run shot off Detroit's Guido Knudson.

Cuthbert was recalled from AAA Omaha on May 7, 2016 when Mike Moustakas was placed on the 15-day disabled list with a fractured finger. In 128 games, he hit .274 with 12 home runs and 46 RBIs.

In 58 games for the Royals in 2017, he hit .231 with 2 home runs and 18 RBIs. He began the 2018 season as the Royals utility player but struggled through the season, hitting .194 in 30 games.

In 2019, Cuthbert played in 87 games for the Royals, he put up better numbers than he had done the previous two seasons combined, as he finished with 330 plate appearances, hitting .246 with 9 home runs and 40 RBI. On December 2, 2019, Cuthbert was non-tendered and became a free agent.

Chicago White Sox
On December 19, 2019, Cuthbert signed a minor league deal with the Chicago White Sox and was invited to spring training. Prior to the season, he was selected to the Nicaragua national baseball team roster at the 2021 World Baseball Classic Qualifier. He was designated for assignment on July 27, 2020.

Cincinnati Reds
On December 8, 2020, Cuthbert signed a minor league contract with the Cincinnati Reds organization, and was invited to spring training. In 21 games for the Triple-A Louisville Bats, Cuthbert slashed .203/.330/.338 before he was released on June 1, 2021.

New York Mets
On June 2, 2021, Cuthbert signed a minor league contract with the New York Mets organization.

Leones de Yucatán
On January 11, 2022, Cuthbert signed with the Leones de Yucatán of the Mexican League for the 2022 season.

Personal life
Cuthbert has a son and a daughter. He lives in Corn Island during the offseason and has a chicken farm of over 150 roosters and 80 hens. Cuthbert's younger cousin, Rodney Theophile, is a Washington Nationals pitching prospect.

References

External links

1992 births
Living people
People from the South Caribbean Coast Autonomous Region
Nicaraguan expatriate baseball players in the United States
Major League Baseball players from Nicaragua
Major League Baseball third basemen
Kansas City Royals players
Chicago White Sox players
Arizona League Royals players
Idaho Falls Chukars players
Kane County Cougars players
Wilmington Blue Rocks players
Northwest Arkansas Naturals players
Peoria Javelinas players
Omaha Storm Chasers players
Syracuse Mets players
Yaquis de Obregón players
Gigantes del Cibao players
Nicaraguan expatriate baseball players in the Dominican Republic
Nicaraguan expatriate baseball players in Mexico
2023 World Baseball Classic players